C. candida  may refer to:
 Cancellaria candida, a sea snail species
 Cyclaspis candida, a crustacean species in the genus Cyclaspis

Synonyms
 Carneades candida, a synonym for Euxoa misturata, a moth species found in North America
 Cattleya candida, a synonym for Cattleya loddigesii, an orchid species

See also
 Candida (disambiguation)